Indonesia–Yemen relations are current and historical bilateral relations between Indonesia and Yemen. Indonesia and Yemen shared similarity as the Muslim majority countries, Indonesia is the most popular Muslim country in the world, while Yemen also a Muslim majority nation. Indonesia has an embassy in Sana'a, while Yemen has an embassy in Jakarta. Both the countries have many cultural proximities and similar view on international issues and these nations are members of the Non-Aligned Movement and Organisation of Islamic Cooperation (OIC).

Islam came to Indonesia through Yemeni merchants, the indigenous ruled by Hindu kings converted by seeing the modest of Yemenis, Islam spread through trade in south east Asia archipelago. History of Yemen and Indonesia goes back hundreds of years but because of the colonial-era relationship between the two came to decline.

Arab Indonesians (Arabic: عربٌ إندونيسيون) or Hadharem (حضارم; sing., Hadhrami, حضرمي), informally known as Jama'ah, are Indonesian citizens primarily of mixed Arab — mainly Hadhrami — and Indonesian descent. The group also includes those of Arab descent from other Middle Eastern Arabic speaking nations. Restricted under Dutch East Indies law until 1919, the community elites later gained economic power through real estate investment and trading. Currently found mainly in Java, especially West Java and South Sumatra, they are almost all Muslims.
Hadhrami is from the south of the Arabian peninsula mostly in southern Yemen.

See also 
 Azmatkhan
 Foreign relations of Indonesia
 Foreign relations of Yemen

References

External links
 Embassy of Indonesia in Sana'a

 
Bilateral relations of Yemen
Yemen